The Werra, a river in central Germany, is the right-bank headwater of the Weser. "Weser" is a synonym in an old dialect of German. The Werra has its source near Eisfeld in southern Thuringia. After  the Werra joins the river Fulda in the town of Hann. Münden, forming the Weser.

Its attractions include Eiben Forest near Dermbach, an unusual sandstone cave at Walldorf, the deepest lake in Germany formed by subsidence (near Bernshausen), and Krayenburg, the ruins of a castle.

Its towns and main settlements are Hildburghausen, Meiningen, Bad Salzungen, Tiefenort, Merkers-Kieselbach, Heringen, Philippsthal, Gerstungen, Wanfried, Eschwege, Bad Sooden-Allendorf, Witzenhausen and Hannoversch Münden.

Gallery

See also
Werra Viaduct, Hedemünden
List of rivers of Thuringia
List of rivers of Hesse
List of rivers of Lower Saxony

References

External links 

 
Rivers of Hesse
Rivers of Lower Saxony
Rivers of Thuringia
Federal waterways in Germany
Rivers of Germany